The 1976 Cincinnati Bearcats football team represented University of Cincinnati as an independent during 1976 NCAA Division I-A football season. The Bearcats, led by head coach Tony Mason played their home games at Nippert Stadium.

Schedule

References

Game films
 1976 Cincinnati - Miami (Oh) Football Game Film, Reel 1
 1976 Cincinnati - Miami (Oh) Football Game Film, Reel 2
 1976 Cincinnati - Miami (Oh) Football Game Film, Reel 3
 1976 Cincinnati - Miami (Oh) Football Game Film, Reel 4

Cincinnati
Cincinnati Bearcats football seasons
Cincinnati Bearcats football